Mitroidea is a superfamily of Recent and fossil sea snails, marine gastropod mollusks within the order Neogastropoda.

Families
 Charitodoronidae Fedosov, Herrmann, Kantor & Bouchet, 2018
 Mitridae Swainson, 1831
 Pyramimitridae Cossmann, 1901
Family brought into synonymy
 Pleioptygmatidae Quinn, 1989 synonym of Pleioptygmatinae Quinn, 1989 represented as Mitridae Swainson, 1831

References

Lost and found: The Eocene family Pyramimitridae (Neogastropoda) discovered in the Recent fauna of the Indo-Pacific. Zootaxa 3754(3): 239-276
 Bouchet P., Rocroi J.P., Hausdorf B., Kaim A., Kano Y., Nützel A., Parkhaev P., Schrödl M. & Strong E.E. (2017). Revised classification, nomenclator and typification of gastropod and monoplacophoran families. Malacologia. 61(1-2): 1-526

External links

 
Neogastropoda
Gastropod superfamilies